The following is a partial list of films set in Sydney.

1910s 
 The Sentimental Bloke (1919)

1920s 
 The Kid Stakes (1927)

1960s 
 They're a Weird Mob (1966)

1970s 
 Stone (1974)
 Caddie (1976)
 The FJ Holden (1977)
 The Night the Prowler (1978)

1980s 
 Puberty Blues (1981)
 Winter of Our Dreams (1981)
 Dead Easy (1982)
 Heatwave (1982)
 Starstruck (1982)
 BMX Bandits (1983)
 Around the World in Eighty Ways (1987)
 Emerald City (1988)

1990s 

 The Rescuers Down Under (1990)
 Strictly Ballroom (1992)
 The Adventures of Priscilla, Queen of the Desert (1994)
 Muriel's Wedding (1994)
 The Sum of Us (1994)
 Napoleon (1995)
 Dating the Enemy (1996)
 The Boys (1998)
Strange Planet (1999)
 Erskineville Kings (1999)
 Two Hands (1999)

2000s 
 Looking for Alibrandi (2000)
 Mission: Impossible 2 (2000)
 Our Lips Are Sealed (2000)
 Lantana (2001)
 He Died with a Felafel in His Hand (2001)
 Dirty Deeds (2002)
 Garage Days (2002)
 Scooby-Doo! and the Legend of the Vampire (2002)
 Finding Nemo (2003)
 Godzilla: Final Wars (2004)
 Little Fish (2005)
 Footy Legends (2006)
 The Tender Hook (2008)
 The Combination (2009)
 Cedar Boys (2009)

2010s
 Inception (2010)
 The Eye of the Storm (2011)
 Around the Block (2012)
 Nerve (2013)
Manny Lewis (2015)
Ruben Guthrie (2015)
Down Under (2016)
Ladies in Black (2018)
Palm Beach (2019)

Sydney
 
Films
Lists of mass media in Australia